Black Woman may refer to:

 Black women
 Black Woman (album), by Sonny Sharrock
 "Femme noire", a poem by Léopold Sédar Senghor

See also
 
Black Man (disambiguation)
Black people